Dunvegan-Central Peace-Notley was a provincial electoral district in Alberta, Canada mandated to return a single member to the Legislative Assembly of Alberta using the first-past-the-post method of voting from 2012 to 2019.

History
The electoral district was created in the 2010 electoral boundary re-distribution from the old electoral district of Dunvegan-Central Peace. The distribution saw the north end of the constituency that resided with the Municipal District of Northern Lights being redistributed to the Peace River electoral district. The electoral district is one of two in the province that is considered a special district and allowed to have less than the average population due to the lack of population and distance between communities.

The change in name came from a write in campaign from Alberta New Democratic Party members who wanted to tack on Notley after their former leader Grant Notley onto the electoral district name because he was an MLA for Spirit River-Fairview an old electoral district that existed in the area. They pressed for the change due to other former provincial Premiers and Opposition leaders getting districts named after them such as Edmonton-Decore and Calgary-Lougheed. The Electoral Boundaries Commission refused the request, and the name change was facilitated by an amendment to the Electoral Divisions Act proposed by independent MLA Dave Taylor, which was carried by the Legislature.

Boundary history

Representation history

The former Progressive Conservative MLA Hector Goudreau served three terms in office after first being elected in the 2001 election, but after resigning as chair of the Cabinet Policy Committee on Community Development after allegations of bullying local school officials, he did not run again in the 2015 provincial election. NDP MLA Marg McCuaig-Boyd was elected in the orange wave that swept the province in the 2015 election, and served as the provincial Energy Minister.

General election results

See also
List of Alberta provincial electoral districts

References

External links
Elections Alberta
The Legislative Assembly of Alberta

Alberta provincial electoral districts